Maria Dowling (1955–2011) was a historian. She was a senior lecturer in history at St Mary’s University College, Twickenham, England. Her best-known work is arguably Humanism in the Age of Henry VIII.

References

1955 births
2011 deaths
British historians
British women historians